Van Laack is a German fashion company with its headquarters in Mönchengladbach, North Rhine-Westphalia, started in the year 1881 in the German capital of Berlin.

In 2002, the shirtmaker was bought by Christoph Neizert, who owns 49 percent of the company, and Christian von Daniels, who owns the majority stake.

References

Clothing brands of Germany
Manufacturing companies based in Berlin
Companies based in North Rhine-Westphalia
Mönchengladbach